Gefferson da Silva Goulart was born on 9 January, 1978 in Sao Goncalo, Brazil. He is commonly known as Gefferson Goulart, is a Brazilian footballer.

Playing career
Gefferson played with União São João in 1997. By 2000 he settled in Trinidad and Tobago playing with W Connection. Between January and December 2004, Gefferson and his compatriot and W Connection teammate Ronaldo Viana played on loan with Serbian side FK Železnik in the First League of Serbia and Montenegro. The club was performing well those years, and Gefferson got the chance to play in the 2004–05 UEFA Cup narrowly losing against Steaua by a goal difference in the overall of the two leggs. He also played a game in the 2004–05 Serbia and Montenegro Cup contributing for the conquest of the cup title that year.

Gefferson and Ronaldo both returned from Serbia by the end of 2004 and were included in the W Connection team for their 2005 campaign.  Already before having their stint in Europe, Gefferson and Ronaldo were key-players in the 5 seasons they had spent with W Connection before 2004, and helped the club win two championships as well as several trophies. Further more, upon its return, Gefferson won one more TT Pro League with W Connection and also the Golden Boot and Player of the Year award in 2005.

Later, he had a spell in South Korea with Busan IPark, and in Angola with Libolo.

Statistics

Honours
Club:

W Connection
TT Pro League: 2000, 2001, 2005
Trinidad and Tobago Cup: 2001
Trinidad and Tobago Pro Bowl: 2001, 2002
CFU Club Championship: 2002

Železnik
Serbia and Montenegro Cup: 2005

Individual:

TT Pro League Golden Boot: 2005 (14 goals, title shared with Earl Jean)
TT Pro League player of the year: 2005

References

External links
 SoccerStats.us
 
 

1978 births
Living people
People from São Gonçalo, Rio de Janeiro
Brazilian footballers
Association football midfielders
União São João Esporte Clube players
W Connection F.C. players
FK Železnik players
Busan IPark players
TT Pro League players
K League 1 players
Brazilian expatriate footballers
Expatriate footballers in Trinidad and Tobago
Brazilian expatriate sportspeople in Trinidad and Tobago
Expatriate footballers in Serbia and Montenegro
Brazilian expatriate sportspeople in Serbia and Montenegro
Expatriate footballers in South Korea
Brazilian expatriate sportspeople in South Korea
Expatriate footballers in Angola
Brazilian expatriate sportspeople in Angola
Sportspeople from Rio de Janeiro (state)